Counties 1 Durham & Northumberland, formerly known as Durham/Northumberland 1 is an English amateur rugby union competition. The league consists of twelve clubs, and is the seventh tier of the English rugby union system, as one of the 16 regional leagues, though is the highest level of local rugby in the North East of England. The champions are automatically promoted to North 1 East, a division with a wider geographical area that also encompasses the Yorkshire region. The runners-up participate in a play-off against the runners-up from the equivalent regional league, Yorkshire 1, for promotion. The bottom two are relegated to Counties 2 Durham & Northumberland.

Each season, two teams from the league are selected to take part in the RFU Intermediate Cup, a national competition for clubs in the seventh tier: one is affiliated with the Durham County RFU, the other is affiliated with the Northumberland RFU.

Clubs

Well known clubs have competed in Durham/Northumberland 1 throughout the league's history. Many of these clubs enjoyed successful histories, mainly during the amateur era of rugby. These include Gosforth RFC who in the '70s enjoyed great success, winning the John Player Cup in 1975/76 and 76/77. West Hartlepool who played in the Premiership in the 1990s,   Northern who produced many international players. Clubs such as Alnwick RFC, Stockton RFC and Horden RFC have traditionally played in higher leagues and tend to finish towards the top of Durham/Northumberland 1.

Participating clubs 2022–23

Leaving the league were Percy Park, Northern, South Shields Westoe, Stockton and Aspatria who were all promoted to Regional 2 North. There was no relegation from the league.

Participating clubs 2021–22

Middlesbrough RUFC finished runners-up in DN1 in 2019-20 but were level transferred to Yorkshire 1 for the current season, the space was taken by Aspatria RUFC who were level transferred from North 2 West.

The teams competing in 2021-22 achieved their places in the league based on performances in 2019-20, the 'previous season' column in the table below refers to that season not 2020-21.

Season 2020–21

On 30 October 2020 the RFU announced  that due to the coronavirus pandemic a decision had been taken to cancel Adult Competitive Leagues (National League 1 and below) for the 2020/21 season meaning DN1 was not contested.

Participating clubs 2019-20

Original teams
When league rugby began in 1987 this division contained the following teams:

Acklam
Ashington
Blyth
Darlington
Horden
Percy Park
Ponteland
Redcar
Rockcliff
Seghill
Winlanton Vulcans

Durham/Northumberland 1 honours

Durham/Northumberland 1 (1987–1993)

The original Durham/Northumberland 1 was a tier 9 league with promotion up to North East 2 and relegation down to Durham/Northumberland 2.

Durham/Northumberland 1 (1993–2000)

The creation of National 5 North for the 1993–94 season meant that Durham/Northumberland 1 dropped to being a tier 10 league.  A further restructure at the end of the 1995–96 season, which included the cancellation of National 5 North and the addition of North East 3 at tier 9, saw Durham/Northumberland 1 remain at tier 10 with promotion to the new North 3 East league.

Durham/Northumberland 1 (2000–present)

Northern league restructuring by the RFU at the end of the 1999–2000 season saw the cancellation of North East 1, North East 2 and North East 3 (tiers 7–9).  This meant that Durham/Northumberland 1 became a tier 7 league, with promotion to North 2 East (currently North 1 East).

Promotion play-offs
Since the 2000–01 season there has been a play-off between the runners-up of Durham/Northumberland 1 and Yorkshire 1 for the third and final promotion place to North 1 East. The team with the superior league record has home advantage in the tie.  At the end of the 2019–20 season Yorkshire 1 teams have been the most successful with thirteen wins to the Durham/Northumberland 1 teams six; and the home side have won ten times to the away sides nine.

Number of league titles

Horden (4)
Consett (3)
Northern (3)
Percy Park (3)
Darlington (2)
Durham City (2)
Gateshead (2)
Hartlepool Rovers (2)
Alnwick (1)
Ashington (1)
Billingham (1)
Blyth (1)
Guisborough (1)
Medicals (1)
Mowden Park (1)
Redcar (1)
Ryton (1)
Whitby (1)
Rockcliff (1)
West Hartlepool TDSOB (1)
Westoe (1)

Notes

See also
 Durham RFU
 Northumberland RFU
 English rugby union system
 Rugby union in England

References

7
Rugby union in Northumberland
Rugby union in County Durham